The Voice Hrvatska (formerly The Voice – Najljepši glas Hrvatske) is a reality singing competition and version of The Voice of Holland for Croatia.  It is part of the international syndication The Voice based on the reality singing competition launched in the Netherlands, created by Dutch television producer John de Mol.

One of the important premises of the show is the quality of the singing talent. Four coaches, themselves popular performing artists, train the talents in their group and occasionally perform with them. Talents are selected in blind auditions, where the coaches cannot see, but only hear the auditioner.

Format 
The series consists of three phases: a blind audition, a battle phase, and live performance shows. Four judges/coaches, all noteworthy recording artists, choose teams of contestants through a blind audition process. Each judge has the length of the auditioner's performance (about one minute) to decide if he or she wants that singer on his or her team; if two or more judges want the same singer (as happens frequently), the singer has the final choice of coach.
Each team of singers is mentored and developed by its respective coach. In the second stage, called the battle phase, coaches have two of their team members battle against each other directly by singing the same song together, with the coach choosing which team member to advance from each of four individual "battles" into the first live round. Within that first live round, the surviving acts from each team again compete head-to-head, with a combination of public and jury vote deciding who advances onto the next round.
In the final phase, the remaining contestants (top 8) compete against each other in live broadcasts. 
The television audience and the coaches have equal say 50/50 in deciding who moves on to the final 4 phase. With one team member remaining for each coach, the (final 4) contestants compete against each other in the finale with the outcome decided solely by public vote.

The series is about to return at the end of 2023 for its fourth season and is scheduled to have its fifth season in 2025.

HRT opened the applications on 10th of March 2023. and set the premiere of the fourth season on 11th of November 2023. . The season will consist of 12 episodes with the final set to air on 27th of January 2024.

Coaches and hosts

Coaches

Hosts

Season summary

 Team Ivan
 Team Anthony
 Team Indira
 Team Jacques
 Team Massimo†
 Team Vanna
 Team Gobac

Coaches' teams 

  Winner
  Runner-up

  Third place
  Fourth place

See also
The Voice (franchise)

References

External links
Official website

Croatian television series
2015 Croatian television series debuts
Croatian Radiotelevision original programming
Hrvatska